Christou (Greek: Χρήστου) is a Greek patronymic surname meaning son of Christos. Notable examples include:

Andreas Christou (born 1948), Mayor of Limassol
Ang Christou (born 1972), Australian rules footballer
B. Christou (1941-2018), Australian writer
Jani Christou (1926-1970), Greek composer
Ioannis Christou (born 1983), Greek rower
Konstantinos Christou (1863-1905), Greek fighter
Paraskevas Christou (born 1984), Cypriot footballer

Greek-language surnames
Surnames
Patronymic surnames
Surnames from given names